Sepsi Arena is a multi-purpose indoor arena in Sfântu Gheorghe, Romania. The building is located next to the Stadionul Sepsi.

References
 

 

 

Sports venues in Romania
Indoor arenas in Romania
Indoor ice hockey venues in Romania 
Basketball venues in Romania